The Martyrs of Roermond were a group of 13 Dutch Catholic clerics, secular and religious, who were murdered on 23 July 1572 in the town of Roermond by militant Dutch Calvinists during the 16th-century religious wars—specifically, the Dutch Revolt against Spanish rule, which developed into the Eighty Years' War.

Events 
On April 1, 1572 a group of Dutch rebels led by William van der Marck, Lord of Lumey, and by two of his captains, Willem Bloys van Treslong and Lenaert Jansz de Graeff managed to take the harbor city of Brielle - a turning point in the Dutch war against the Spanish Empire. Prince William the Silent, the main leader of the Dutch revolt against King Philip II of Spain, was in exile in Germany when he heard of the succes of dutch rebels in the Netherlands - not only did they manage to take Brielle, other cities in the Western part of the Netherlands quickly fell to the Dutch rebels. To support the revolt, William of Orange launched an invasion of the Spanish Netherlands from 3 sides: 2 armies would attack the Spanish Netherlands from Germany and 1 would invade from the South. The army led by William of Orange attacked the Southern part of the Netherlands, now the provinces of North Brabant, Limburg and Flanders. One of the first cities to be attacked was the Spanish held city of Roermond. An army of 24,000 men attacked Roermond and managed to take it after 5 assaults on 23 July 1572. After the capture of the city the troops of William the Silent stormed Roermond and massacred many priests and clerics, including the secretary of Bishop Lindanus. The Roermond Charterhouse was assaulted by Protestants. Of the 24 Carthusians 13 were murdered and two died in the days that followed.

The 13 martyrs 

 Stefanus van Roermond
 Albertus van Winsen
 Johannes van Sittard
 Erasmus van Maastricht
 Matthias van Keulen
 Henricus Wellen
 Johannes van Luik
 Johannes Leeuwis
 Johannes Gressenich
 Severus van Koblenz
 Paulus van Waelwijck
 Wilhelmus Wellen
 Vincentius van Herck

Legacy
Numerous works of art were created to commemorate the events in Roermond. The Italian painter Vincenzo Carducci made three paintings about the Roermond Martyrs in 1632:

See also
 Martyrs of Alkmaar
 Martyrs of Gorkum

Notes 

16th-century births
1572 deaths
Lists of Christian martyrs
Dutch Roman Catholic saints
Eighty Years' War (1566–1609)
History of South Holland
Martyred groups
16th-century Christian saints
16th-century Roman Catholic martyrs
Martyred Roman Catholic priests
1572 in Europe
Roermond

Bibliography 
On the martyrs of Roermond, see Hesse, “De martelaren van Roermond,” Limburg's Jaarboek (1911), 170–209, 264–290.